Caterina e le sue figlie (Caterina and her daughters) (known internationally as My Daughters) is an Italian television series that aired from December 4, 2005 to March 3, 2010 on Canale 5. The comedy series follows single mother Catherine (Virna Lisi) as she tries to balance raising three daughters alone and dating.

Cast 
Virna Lisi: Caterina Foresi in Parisi - Pensiero
Alessandra Martines: Adele Parisi
Valeria Milillo: Agostina Parisi
Sarah Felberbaum: Carlotta Parisi
Nancy Brilli: Renata Pensiero
Manuela Arcuri: Morena
Carol Alt: Ines
Iva Zanicchi: Liliana
Alessandro Benvenuti: Ettore
Ray Lovelock: Attilio Pensiero
Giuliana De Sio: Cetty Saponero
Eva Grimaldi: Eleonora
Rossy de Palma: Estrella Toledo
Ángela Molina: Maria

See also
List of Italian television series

External links
 

Italian television series
Canale 5 original programming